Emilian Kaszczyk (born 21 April 1980) is a retired Polish high jumper.

He is mainly known as the gold medalist at the 2003 Summer Universiade. His personal best is 2.28 metres, achieved in July 2003 in Bielsko-Biala.

References

1980 births
Living people
Polish male high jumpers
Universiade medalists in athletics (track and field)
Place of birth missing (living people)
Universiade gold medalists for Poland
Medalists at the 2003 Summer Universiade